The Icy Cape is a headland on the Chukchi Sea side of the North Slope Borough, Alaska, United States.  It was discovered and named by James Cook on August 17, 1778, on account of the ice along the coast.

Icy Cape is in an area of landspits, bounded by Kasegaluk Lagoon to the east and Sikolik Lake further inland.

Pink salmon and Arctic char are abundant in the waters near Icy Cape. Whales can also easily be sighted offshore in the Icy Cape area.

Icy Cape was formerly the site of the Icy Cape DEW Line Station, a United States Air Force Distant Early Warning Line Radar station

Demographics

Icy Cape appeared on the 1880 U.S. Census as the Inuit village of Otok-kok. It returned as Icy Cape in 1890.

In popular culture 
Icy Cape is the setting for "Ice", an episode of the first season of the American television series The X-Files.

References

External links
 
 

Headlands of Alaska
Landforms of North Slope Borough, Alaska